Henrik Berggren Møller (born 16 November 1965 in Helsingør) is a Danish politician, who is a member of the Folketing for the Social Democrats political party. He was elected into parliament at the 2019 Danish general election.

Political career
Møller sat in the municipal council of Helsingør Municipality from 1986 to 1993 and again from 1998 to 2019. He served as deputy mayor in the municipality from 2006 to 2019. He was elected into parliament at the 2019 election, where he received 4,223 personal votes.

References

External links
 Biography on the website of the Danish Parliament (Folketinget)

Living people
1986 births
People from Helsingør
Social Democrats (Denmark) politicians
Danish municipal councillors
Members of the Folketing 2019–2022
Members of the Folketing 2022–2026